Buttermilk Creek is a tributary of the Muskrat River in the township of Whitewater Region, Renfrew County, Ontario, Canada.

Course
Buttermilk Creek begins at Astrolabe Lake, formerly Green Lake and within the grounds of Logos Land water park, and travels  before reaching its mouth at the Muskrat River near the community of Cobden. The Muskrat River empties into the Ottawa River at Pembroke.

Economy
Ontario Highway 17 parallels the lower ⅔ of the creek. Buttermilk Creek Trout Farm, in operation raising rainbow trout for more than 20 years, is located on the creek banks.

See also
List of rivers of Ontario

References

Rivers of Renfrew County